Lyssomanes is a spider genus of the family Salticidae (jumping spiders), ranging from South and Central America, up to the southern United States.

There have been described 94 extant and two fossil species from the Neotropical Region. The genera Lyssomanes, Chinoscopus, Hindumanes, and Sumakuru make up the Lyssomaninae, which is one of the six deeply-diverging subfamilies of jumping spiders.

They are long-legged, with translucent bodies frequently green or yellow. They resemble lynx spiders, except that they have large anterior median eyes.

Habitat
Lyssomanes are typically found in foliage in mesic habitats.

Species
, the World Spider Catalog accepted the following species:

Lyssomanes adisi Logunov, 2002 – Brazil
Lyssomanes amazonicus Peckham, Peckham & Wheeler, 1889 – Colombia, Ecuador, Bolivia, Brazil, Guyana
Lyssomanes anchicaya Galiano, 1984 – Costa Rica, Panama, Colombia
Lyssomanes antillanus Peckham, Peckham & Wheeler, 1889 – Cuba, Jamaica, Hispaniola, Saba
Lyssomanes austerus Peckham, Peckham & Wheeler, 1889 – Brazil, Argentina
Lyssomanes aya Logunov, 2015 – French Guiana
Lyssomanes belgranoi Galiano, 1984 – Argentina
Lyssomanes benderi Logunov, 2002 – Brazil, Ecuador, French Guiana
Lyssomanes bitaeniatus Peckham, Peckham & Wheeler, 1889 – El Salvador to Venezuela
Lyssomanes blandus Peckham, Peckham & Wheeler, 1889 – Guatemala
Lyssomanes boraceia Galiano, 1984 – Brazil
Lyssomanes bryantae Chickering, 1946 – Panama
Lyssomanes burrera Jiménez & Tejas, 1993 – Mexico
Lyssomanes camacanensis Galiano, 1980 – Brazil
Lyssomanes ceplaci Galiano, 1980 – Brazil
Lyssomanes consimilis Banks, 1929 – Panama
Lyssomanes convexus Banks, 1909 – Costa Rica
Lyssomanes courtiali Logunov, 2015 – French Guiana
Lyssomanes deinognathus F. O. Pickard-Cambridge, 1900 – Mexico to Honduras
Lyssomanes devotoi Mello-Leitão, 1917 – Brazil
Lyssomanes dissimilis Banks, 1929 – Panama
Lyssomanes diversus Galiano, 1980 – Mexico
Lyssomanes eatoni Chickering, 1946 – Panama
Lyssomanes ecuadoricus Logunov & Marusik, 2003 – Ecuador
Lyssomanes elegans F. O. Pickard-Cambridge, 1900 – Mexico to Brazil
Lyssomanes elongatus Galiano, 1980 – Brazil
Lyssomanes euriensis Logunov, 2000 – Peru
Lyssomanes flagellum Kraus, 1955 – El Salvador
Lyssomanes fossor Galiano, 1996 – Brazil
Lyssomanes franckei Galvis, 2020 – Mexico
Lyssomanes hieroglyphicus Mello-Leitão, 1944 – Argentina
Lyssomanes ipanemae Galiano, 1980 – Brazil, French Guiana
Lyssomanes janauari Logunov & Marusik, 2003 – Brazil
Lyssomanes jemineus Peckham, Peckham & Wheeler, 1889 – Mexico to Guyana
Lyssomanes jucari Galiano, 1984 – Brazil
Lyssomanes lampeli Logunov, 2014 – Guyana
Lyssomanes lancetillae Galiano, 1980 – Honduras, Nicaragua
Lyssomanes lehtineni Logunov, 2000 – Peru
Lyssomanes leucomelas Mello-Leitão, 1917 – Mexico, Brazil, Argentina
Lyssomanes limpidus Galiano, 1980 – Colombia
Lyssomanes longipes (Taczanowski, 1871) – Brazil, French Guiana, Guyana
Lyssomanes maddisoni Logunov, 2014 – Mexico
Lyssomanes malinche Galiano, 1980 – Mexico
Lyssomanes manausensis Logunov, 2014 – Brazil
Lyssomanes mandibulatus F. O. Pickard-Cambridge, 1900 – Mexico to Panama
Lyssomanes matoensis Logunov, 2014 – Brazil
Lyssomanes mexicanus Logunov, 2014 – Mexico
Lyssomanes michae Brignoli, 1984 – West Indies
Lyssomanes miniaceus Peckham, Peckham & Wheeler, 1889 – Brazil, Argentina
Lyssomanes minor Schenkel, 1953 – Venezuela
Lyssomanes nigrofimbriatus Mello-Leitão, 1941 – Brazil, Argentina
Lyssomanes nigropictus Peckham, Peckham & Wheeler, 1889 – Brazil, Guyana, Suriname, French Guiana, Ecuador
Lyssomanes onkonensis Logunov & Marusik, 2003 – Ecuador
Lyssomanes parallelus Peckham, Peckham & Wheeler, 1889 – Brazil
Lyssomanes paravelox Logunov, 2002 – Brazil
Lyssomanes parki Chickering, 1946 – Panama
Lyssomanes patens Peckham & Peckham, 1896 – Honduras to Panama
Lyssomanes pauper Mello-Leitão, 1945 – Brazil, Argentina
Lyssomanes penicillatus Mello-Leitão, 1927 – Brazil, Argentina
Lyssomanes perafani Galvis, 2017 – Colombia
Lyssomanes peruensis Logunov, 2000 – Peru
Lyssomanes pescadero Jiménez & Tejas, 1993 – Mexico
Lyssomanes pichilingue Galiano, 1984 – Ecuador
Lyssomanes placidus Peckham, Peckham & Wheeler, 1889 – Mexico
Lyssomanes portoricensis Petrunkevitch, 1930 – Puerto Rico to Martinique
Lyssomanes protarsalis F. O. Pickard-Cambridge, 1900 – Guatemala
Lyssomanes quadrinotatus Simon, 1900 – Venezuela
Lyssomanes reductus Peckham & Peckham, 1896 – Mexico to Panama
Lyssomanes remotus Peckham & Peckham, 1896 – Panama to Brazil
Lyssomanes robustus (Taczanowski, 1878) – Peru, Brazil
Lyssomanes romani Logunov, 2000 – Brazil, Ecuador
Lyssomanes rudis Logunov, 2015 – French Guiana
Lyssomanes santarem Galiano, 1984 – Brazil
Lyssomanes silvestris Logunov, 2014 – Brazil
Lyssomanes similis Logunov, 2014 – Brazil
Lyssomanes spiralis F. O. Pickard-Cambridge, 1900 – Mexico to Nicaragua
Lyssomanes sylvicola Galiano, 1980 – Brazil
Lyssomanes taczanowskii Galiano, 1980 – Trinidad to Peru, Ecuador
Lyssomanes tapirapensis Galiano, 1996 – Venezuela, French Guiana, Brazil
Lyssomanes tapuiramae Galiano, 1980 – Brazil
Lyssomanes tarmae Galiano, 1980 – Peru
Lyssomanes temperatus Galiano, 1980 – Mexico
Lyssomanes tenuis Peckham, Peckham & Wheeler, 1889 – Colombia, Ecuador, Brazil, Guyana
Lyssomanes trifurcatus F. O. Pickard-Cambridge, 1900 – Panama
Lyssomanes trinidadus Logunov & Marusik, 2003 – Trinidad
Lyssomanes tristis Peckham, Peckham & Wheeler, 1889 – Brazil, Argentina
Lyssomanes unicolor (Taczanowski, 1871) – Mexico to Peru, Ecuador, Brazil
Lyssomanes velox Peckham, Peckham & Wheeler, 1889 – Brazil, Ecuador
Lyssomanes vinocurae Galiano, 1996 – Brazil
Lyssomanes viridis (Walckenaer, 1837) (type species) – USA
Lyssomanes waorani Logunov & Marusik, 2003 – Ecuador
Lyssomanes wiwa Galvis, 2017 – Colombia  
Lyssomanes yacui Galiano, 1984 – Argentina, Paraguay, Brazil

References

Further reading
 Hill, David Edwin (1977). "Observations on the physiology of Lyssomanes viridis." Peckhamia 1(3): 41-44. PDF
 Teodore, C. & Johnsen, S. (2013). "Pheromones exert top-down effects on visual recognition in the jumping spider Lyssomanes viridis". The Journal of Experimental Biology 216, 1744-1756. PDF

External links

Videos
 David Edwin Hill: Courtship and mating of the jumping spider Lyssomanes viridis (Araneae: Salticidae) — Video
 David Edwin Hill: Feeding Lyssomanes viridis (Araneae: Salticidae) — Video

Pictures
 Photographs of Lyssomanes species from Brazil
 Paintings of Lyssomanes sp.
 Picture of Lyssomanes sp.

Salticidae genera
Spiders of North America
Spiders of South America
Taxa named by Nicholas Marcellus Hentz
Salticidae